Jøkulfallet is a steep ice slope on the north side of Jokulkyrkja Mountain in the Mühlig-Hofmann Mountains of Queen Maud Land, Antarctica. It was plotted from surveys and air photos by the Sixth Norwegian Antarctic Expedition (1956–60) and named Jøkulfallet (the glacier fall).

References

Ice slopes of Queen Maud Land
Princess Astrid Coast